Margaret Chan Fung Fu-chun,  (born 21 August 1947) is a Chinese-Canadian physician, who served as the Director-General of the World Health Organization (WHO) delegating the People's Republic of China from 2006–2017. Chan previously served as Director of Health in the Hong Kong Government (1994–2003) and representative of the WHO Director-General for Pandemic Influenza and WHO Assistant Director-General for Communicable Diseases (2003–2006). In 2014, Forbes ranked her as the 30th most powerful woman in the world.  In early 2018 she joined the Chinese People's Political Consultative Conference (CPPCC).

She was widely criticized for her handling of the 1997 H5N1 avian influenza outbreak and the 2003 SARS outbreak in Hong Kong, and for her frequent travels while Director-General of the WHO.

Early life and education 
Chan was born and raised in British Hong Kong, now the Hong Kong Special Administrative Region of the People's Republic of China. Her ancestors came from Shunde, Guangdong. 

Chan received a professional degree for teaching home economics at the Northecote College of Education in Hong Kong. She received a bachelor of arts with a major in home economics in 1973 and a doctor of medicine in 1977 from the University of Western Ontario in Canada. She received a master of science (public health) from the National University of Singapore in 1985. 

Chan completed the Program for Management Development (PMD 61) at Harvard Business School in 1991.

Career

Early career 
Chan joined the Government of British Hong Kong in December 1978 as a medical officer. In November 1989, she was promoted to assistant director of the Department of Health. In April 1992, she was promoted to deputy director and, in June 1994, was named the first woman in Hong Kong to head the Department of Health.

Director of Health in Hong Kong, 1994–2003 
Chan survived the transition from British to PRC-HKSAR rule in June 1997. Her profile was raised by her handling, in those positions, of the 1997 H5N1 avian influenza outbreak and the 2003 SARS outbreak in Hong Kong. After the first cases of the H5N1 died, Chan first tried to reassure Hong Kong residents with statements such as "I ate chicken last night" or "I eat chicken every day, don't panic, everyone". When many more H5N1 cases appeared, she was criticized for misleading the public.
 She became "a symbol of ignorance and arrogance epitomizing the mentality of 'business as usual' embedded in the ideological and institutional practices within the bureaucracy, especially after the hand-over." In the end, she was credited for helping bring the epidemic under control by the slaughter of 1.5 million chickens in the region in the face of stiff political opposition.

Her performance during the SARS outbreak, which ultimately led to 299 deaths, attracted harsh criticism from the Legislative Council of Hong Kong and many people with SARS and their relatives. She was criticised by the Legislative Council for her passiveness, for believing in misleading information shared by the mainland authority, and for not acting swiftly. She was also criticised for a lack of political wisdom was evident in her indifference to media reports and widespread public fear at that time. On the other hand, the SARS expert committee established by the HKSAR government to assess its handling of the crisis, opined that the failure was not Chan's fault, but due to the structure of Hong Kong's health care system, in which the separation of the hospital authority from the public health authority resulted in problems with data sharing.

Assistant to DGWHO
Chan left the Hong Kong Government in August 2003 after 25 years of service to join the World Health Organization.
From 2003 until 2005, Chan served as the Representative of the World Health Organization Director-General for Pandemic Influenza and as Assistant Director-General for Communicable Diseases.

Director-General of WHO, 2006–2017 
Chan served two terms of five years apiece as Director-General of the WHO. Appointed to the post in November 2006, Chan's first term ran through to June 2012. In her appointment speech, Chan considered the "improvements in the health of the people of Africa and the health of women" to be the key performance indicator of WHO and she wants to focus WHO's attention on "the people in greatest need." On 18 January 2012, Chan was nominated by the WHO's executive board for a second term and was confirmed by the World Health Assembly on 23 May 2012. In her acceptance speech, Chan indicated that universal coverage is a "powerful equaliser" and the most powerful concept of public health. Chan's new term began on 1 July 2012 and continued until 30 June 2017.

First term

In February 2007, Chan provoked the anger of humanitarian and civil society groups including Doctors Without Borders by questioning the quality of generic medicines while on a visit to Thailand.

In 2010 Chan was criticised for "crying wolf" about the 2009 flu pandemic, which turned out to be much milder than expected.

After a visit to North Korea in April 2010, Chan said malnutrition was a problem in the country but that North Korea's health system would be the envy of many developing countries because of the abundance of medical staff. She also noted there were no signs of obesity in the country, which is a newly emerging problem in other parts of Asia. Chan's comments marked a significant departure from that of her predecessor, Gro Harlem Brundtland, who said in 2001 that North Korea's health system was near collapse. The director-general's assessment was criticised, including in a Wall Street Journal editorial which called her statements "surreal." The editorial further stated, "Ms. Chan is either winking at the reality to maintain contact with the North or she allowed herself to be fooled."

In 2011, because of financial constraints in donor countries the WHO slashed its budget by nearly $1 billion and cut 300 jobs at its headquarters under Chan's leadership.

Second term

The WHO was accused  of deferring to the Syrian government of President Bashar al-Assad when polio made a comeback in that country in late 2013.

In 2014 and 2015, Chan was again heavily criticised because of the slow response of the WHO to the Ebola virus epidemic in West Africa.

In 2016 at the request of the WHA, Chan launched the Health Emergencies Programme.

After WHO 
In 2018, Chan joined the Task Force on Fiscal Policy for Health, a group convened by Michael R. Bloomberg and Lawrence H. Summers to address preventable leading causes of death and noncommunicable diseases through fiscal policy. The same year, she was appointed to the Council of Advisors of the Boao Forum for Asia.

In December 2021, during the 2021 Hong Kong legislative election, Chan said, of the election where only "patriots" could serve in the government, "The new election system is going to be very good for Hong Kong, for Hong Kong's long-term development, and for Hong Kong's democracy to take a step by step approach."

In August 2022, after Nancy Pelosi visited Taiwan, Chan said "As the No 3 figure in the US government, Pelosi visiting Taiwan on a US military plane is a gross interference in China's internal affairs, seriously undermining China's sovereignty and territorial integrity, wantonly trampling on the one-China principle, seriously threatening the peace and stability of the Taiwan Strait, and seriously damaging Sino-US relations."

Other activities 
 Exemplars in Global Health, Member of the Senior Advisory Board (since 2020)

Recognition 
In 1997, Chan was given the distinction for the Fellowship of the Faculty of Public Health Medicine of the Royal College of Physicians of the United Kingdom and was also appointed as an Officer of the Order of the British Empire by Queen Elizabeth II.

In 2014, Chan was ranked as the 30th most powerful woman in the world, based on her position as Director-General, by Forbes. Her ranking increased from 33rd in 2013.

Personal life 
Margaret Chan is married to David Chan, who is an ophthalmologist.

References

Further reading 
 Dr Chan's CV (Ministry of Foreign Affairs of the People's Republic of China)
 Health, Welfare and Food Bureau, HK Government introduction
 China's Margaret Chan says to work tirelessly for world health (People's Daily Online)
 Bird flu expert set to lead WHO (BBC News)
 WHO Board Nominates Margaret Chan As Director General (Wall Street Journal Online)
 Who's Next at WHO? (Time online's blog)

External links 

 WHO website:
 Director-General's office
 Director-General: Dr Margaret Chan
 Director-General election (2006)
 Director-General nomination (2012)

Hong Kong medical doctors
University of Western Ontario alumni
World Health Organization officials
Officers of the Order of the British Empire
1947 births
Fellows of the Royal College of Physicians
Living people
Chinese women physicians
Chinese physicians
Public health and safety in Hong Kong
Canadian public health doctors
National University of Singapore alumni
20th-century Canadian women scientists
21st-century Canadian women scientists
Chinese officials of the United Nations
Canadian officials of the United Nations
Members of the 13th Chinese People's Political Consultative Conference
Members of the National Committee of the Chinese People's Political Consultative Conference
Members of the Standing Committee of the 13th Chinese People's Political Consultative Conference
Women public health doctors